Bigilla is a traditional Maltese dish, made of mashed beans, olive oil, salt and red pepper. It is usually served as a dip. Tic beans, known in Malta as "ful ta' Ġirba" (Djerba beans), are used. These are similar to but smaller than broad beans, with a darker and harder skin.

Bigilla is served as a snack or an hors d'oeuvre and is usually eaten as a spread.

References

See also
 Ful medames

Maltese cuisine
Dips (food)
Legume dishes